The 1995 Australian Formula Ford Championship was a CAMS sanctioned motor racing championship open to Formula Ford racing cars. The championship was the 26th Australian series for Formula Fords, and the third to be contested under the Australian Formula Ford Championship name. The title was won by Jason Bright, driving a Van Diemen RF95.

Calendar
The championship was contested over an eight-round series with two races per round.

Points system
Championship points were awarded at each race on the following basis:

Results

The "Dunlop Rookie of the Year" award was won by Mal Rose.

References

Australian Formula Ford Championship seasons
Formula Ford